The BC Elite Hockey League - U18 AAA (formerly the BC Hockey Major Midget League), or BCEHL, is the highest level of provincial U18 ice hockey league in British Columbia, Canada. Governed by BC Hockey and inaugurated in 2004, the league consists of 10 teams. Players range from 15 to 17 years old. BCEHL is part of BC Hockeys' "High Proformance" program to develop the best midget-aged players around the province. The league champion goes on to compete with the top Alberta Elite Hockey League (AEHL) team to represent the Pacific region at the annual Telus Cup, Canada's national midget championship. The Vancouver North East Chiefs are the current 2022 champions, and were the last team to represent the BCEHL at the Telus Cup.

Current teams
Cariboo Cougars
Fraser Valley Thunderbirds
Greater Vancouver Canadians
North Island Silvertips
Okanagan Rockets
Thompson Blazers
South Island Royals
Valley West Giants
Vancouver North East Chiefs
Vancouver North West Hawks

League champions

a The Giants earned an automatic bye into the Telus Cup because the Red Deer Optimist Rebels were hosting the tournament

Telus Cup
The Vancouver North West Giants (2007, 2011), Okanagan Rockets (2014) and the Vancouver North East Chiefs (2022) are the only teams to have represented the league at the Telus Cup.  Upon the Giants' winning the BC MML championship in 2007, a regional final with the AMHL was not necessary as Red Deer was hosting the Telus Cup that year. The Giants finished fourth in the Telus Cup tournament in 2007 before returning four years later; they again finished fourth in 2011. The 2014 Rockets, meanwhile, won the bronze medal.

Prior to the inauguration of the BC MML, the national midget championship was held in British Columbia twice – hosted by Kelowna in 1996 and Prince George in 2001.  The Burnaby Winter Club Travellers represent the only B.C. team to win the national championship, defeating the Gouverneurs de Ste-Foy from Quebec in 1982, as well as winning bronze in 1980.

See also
BC Hockey
Telus Cup
Alberta Elite Hockey League

References

External links
 Official Website

Ice hockey leagues in British Columbia
Youth ice hockey leagues in Canada
2004 establishments in British Columbia
Sports leagues established in 2004